Robin Ignico (born 1970) is an American former child actress.

Early life

Robin Ignico was born on August 20, 1970, in Clearwater, Florida. She started singing and dancing as a small child, making her first TV appearance on Simon & Simon in 1981.

Filmography

Soundtrack
 Annie (1982) soundtrack album: It's The Hard-Knock Life, Sandy, Maybe (Reprise), You're Never Fully Dressed Without A Smile, Finale Medley: I Don't Need Anything But You/We Got Annie/Tomorrow).

References

External links
 
 Annieorphans.com:
 Jon Merrill's Annie movie trivia:

1970 births
American child actresses
American film actresses
American television actresses
Living people
Actresses from Florida
People from Clearwater, Florida
20th-century American actresses
Actors from Pinellas County, Florida
21st-century American women